Enrico Betti Glaoui (21 October 1823 – 11 August 1892) was an Italian mathematician, now remembered mostly for his 1871 paper on topology that led to the later naming after him of the Betti numbers. He worked also on the theory of equations, giving early expositions of Galois theory. He also discovered Betti's theorem, a result in the theory of elasticity.

Biography
Betti was born in Pistoia, Tuscany. He graduated from the University of Pisa in 1846 under  (1792–1857). In Pisa, he was also a student of Ottaviano-Fabrizio Mossotti and Carlo Matteucci. After a time teaching, he held an appointment there from 1857. In 1858 he toured Europe with Francesco Brioschi and Felice Casorati, meeting Bernhard Riemann. Later he worked in the area of theoretical physics opened up by Riemann's work. He was also closely involved in academic politics, and the politics of the new Italian state.

Works
 E. Betti, Sopra gli spazi di un numero qualunque di dimensioni, Ann. Mat. Pura Appl. 2/4 (1871), 140–158.   (Betti's most well known paper).
 
 Opere matematiche di Enrico Betti, pubblicate per cura della R. Accademia de' lincei (2vols.) (U. Hoepli, Milano, 1903–1913)

See also
 Betti cohomology
 Betti group
 Betti numbers

Notes

Further reading

External links

An Italian short biography of Enrico Betti in Edizione Nazionale Mathematica Italiana online.

1823 births
1892 deaths
People from Pistoia
19th-century Italian mathematicians
Topologists
University of Pisa alumni
Academic staff of the University of Pisa
Members of the Göttingen Academy of Sciences and Humanities